Masfar is a sub-district located in the Al-Misrakh District, Taiz Governorate, Yemen. Masfar had a population of 9,168 according to the 2004 census.

Villages
Al-Mimshah village.
Al-Qardayn village.
Al-Ghafira village.
Akmat Hubish village.

References

Sub-districts in Al-Misrakh District